Eben Alexander "Pep" Wortham (July 22, 1897 – August 1, 1982) was a college football player and educator.

Sewanee

Playing career
Wortham was a prominent fullback for the Sewanee Tigers of the University of the South.

1916
In 1916, Dick Jemison picked Bill Folger out of North Carolina as a halfback for his All-Southern team. Jemison said had he constrained his selections to the Southern Intercollegiate Athletic Association, Wortham would have taken his spot.

1917
In 1917, the year of Georgia Tech's great backfield, he made the All-Southern teams of Dick Jemison, sporting editor for the Atlanta Constitution, Fred Digby, sporting editor for the New Orleans Item, and Zipp Newman, assistant sporting editor for the Birmingham News. He drop-kicked a 40-yard field goal in the game against LSU to win 3 to 0. Also he drop-kicked a 27-yard field goal in a 3 to 3 tie at Alabama.

Teaching career
After football, he signed on to the university's faculty to teach mathematics, history, tactics, and boxing.

References

Sportspeople from Greenville, Mississippi
1897 births
1982 deaths
Sewanee Tigers football players
American football fullbacks
Players of American football from Mississippi
All-Southern college football players
Sewanee: The University of the South faculty
American football placekickers
American football quarterbacks
American football halfbacks
American football drop kickers